The First Ōkuma Cabinet was the eighth Cabinet of Japan, and was led by Prime Minister Ōkuma Shigenobu from June 30 to November 8, 1898.

Cabinet

References 

Cabinet of Japan
1898 establishments in Japan